Carlos Enrique Palacios Núñez (born 20 July 2000) is a Chilean footballer who plays as an attacking midfielder for Colo-Colo, on loan from Vasco da Gama and the Chile national team.

Club career
On March 22, 2021, he was announced as a new player for Brazilian Série A side Internacional on a deal for a year on loan from Unión Española and a transfer promise for additional three years.

International career
In November 2020, he received his first call up to the Chile senior team for the 2022 World Cup qualifiers against Peru and Venezuela, making his international debut in the match against Venezuela.

Career statistics

Club

Notes

References

External links

2000 births
Living people
People from Santiago
People from Santiago Province, Chile
People from Santiago Metropolitan Region
Footballers from Santiago
Chilean footballers
Chilean expatriate footballers
Chile international footballers
Association football forwards
Chilean Primera División players
Campeonato Brasileiro Série A players
Campeonato Brasileiro Série B players
Unión Española footballers
Sport Club Internacional players
CR Vasco da Gama players
Colo-Colo footballers
Expatriate footballers in Brazil
Chilean expatriate sportspeople in Brazil
Chilean expatriates in Brazil
2021 Copa América players